Maren Johanne Hersleth Holsen (born 20 June 1976) is a Norwegian politician for the Liberal Party.

She was a State Secretary in the Ministry of Climate and Environment from 2020 to 2021, serving in Solberg's Cabinet. She served as a deputy representative to the Parliament of Norway from Akershus during the term 2021–2025.

She is educated as a landscape architect, but became a mutton farmer in Hærland. Entering politics, she became deputy mayor of Eidsberg in 2011. She was a director of planning in Eidsberg municipality from 2015, and continued as a director when Eidsberg was merged into Indre Østfold municipality.

References

1976 births
Living people
People from Eidsberg
Norwegian state secretaries
Deputy members of the Storting
Liberal Party (Norway) politicians
Østfold politicians